Li Changcai (born January 1949) is a retired general in the People's Liberation Army of China. He served as the political commissar of Lanzhou Military Region.

Biography
Li was born in Hefei, Anhui in January 1949. In September 2000, he became political commissar of the 31st Group Army. In July 2005, he became director of political department of Nanjing Military Region. He was elevated to deputy political commissar of Nanjing Military Region in December 2006.  In September 2007, he was appointed as political commissar of Lanzhou Military Region.

He was a member of the 17th Central Committee of the Communist Party of China.

References

1949 births
Living people
People's Liberation Army generals from Anhui
People from Hefei
Political commissars of the Lanzhou Military Region
Deputy political commissars of the Nanjing Military Region
Directors of the political department of the Nanjing Military Region
Members of the 17th Central Committee of the Chinese Communist Party